Salix jepsonii is a species of willow known by the common name Jepson's willow.  it is named for renowned California botanist Willis Linn Jepson.

It is endemic to California, found in the Klamath Mountains and throughout the Sierra Nevada.

Description
The lance-shaped leaves may grow over 10 centimeters long. They are hairy when new, and have silky hairs on the undersides when mature.

The inflorescence is a catkin of flowers, male catkins short and stout, measuring no more than 2 centimeters long, and female catkins reaching up to 6 centimeters in length.  Its bloom period is June.

References

External links
Jepson Manual eFlora (TJM2) treatment of Salix jepsonii
UC CalPhotos gallery: Salix jepsonii

jepsonii
Endemic flora of California
Flora of the Klamath Mountains
Flora of the Sierra Nevada (United States)
Flora without expected TNC conservation status